The 1976 Finnish motorcycle Grand Prix was the ninth round of the 1976 Grand Prix motorcycle racing season. It took place on 1 August 1976 at the Imatra circuit. Pat Hennen won the race to become the first American to win a motorcycle Grand Prix.

500cc classification

350 cc classification

250 cc classification

125 cc classification

50 cc classification

References

Finnish motorcycle Grand Prix
Finnish
Motorcycle Grand Prix